Silverton is an unincorporated community in Shoshone County, Idaho, United States.

Great Fire of 1910 
The National Fire Protection Association lists Silverton as the location of the Devil's Broom fire, also known as the Great Fire of 1910.

Unincorporated communities in Shoshone County, Idaho
Unincorporated communities in Idaho